Strangers is an American comedy-drama series created by Mia Lidofsky that premiered on September 4, 2017, on Facebook Watch. The series stars Zoë Chao and Meredith Hagner and is executive produced by Lidofsky, Jesse Peretz, Michael B. Clark, Alex Turtletaub, M. Blair Brown, and Neena Beber.

Premise
The first season follows "Isobel, a young woman living in Los Angeles who rents out her extra room on Airbnb. She finds herself in need of extra cash after boyfriend moves out when she cheats on him with a woman. As she struggles to make sense of her shifting sexuality, an eccentric cast of characters rotate through her house, bringing both inconveniences and unexpected wisdom."

The second season follows Isobel as she "switches from host to renter when she moves across the country with her best friend, Cam. On the cusp of 30 and now living in NYC, it's Isobel's year to explore the many different paths to adulthood, starting with a new neighborhood each episode. As a woman living fully in the bi-sphere - bisexual, biracial, and now bi-coastal - Isobel is saying yes to life and asking the most difficult question: where do you belong when you’re in between everything?"

Cast and characters

Main
 Zoë Chao as Isobel Song
 Meredith Hagner as Cam

Recurring

 Isabelle McNally as Hailey
 Langston Kerman as Jake
 Morgan Krantz as Ezra
 X Mayo as Robbie
 Kyle Allen as Milo
 Kathleen Munroe as Mari
 Ciara Renée as Sasha
 Stephanie DiMaggio as Stephania, the manager of Le Playground.
 Sarita Choudhury as Brooke
 Raviv Ullman as Royce
 Sue Jean Kim as Elody Wu
 Maureen Sebastian as Stella
 Tara Summers as Andy
 Hans Tester as Henry
 Sydney Mae Diaz as River
 Maria Dizzia as Georgie
 Stephen McKinley Henderson as Billy
 Edward Akrout as Mateo

Guest

 Ebon Moss-Bachrach as the voice of Dad ("Honeymooners")
 Gaby Hoffmann as the voice of Mom ("Honeymooners")
 Jemaine Clement as Oliver ("Honeymooners")
 Matt Oberg as Dave ("Tinder Hearts")
 Shiri Appleby as Minister/Julie ("Water Into Wine")
 Eka Darville as Markquon ("Water Into Wine")
 Jemima Kirke as Emmy ("Homeless")
 Bridget Regan as Ana ("Homeless")
 Holden McNeil as Charlie ("Homeless")
 Sophia Anne Caruso as Lily ("The Big (Gr)apple")
 Michael Cavadias as Joakeem ("The Big (Gr)apple")
 Mahi Alam as Samir ("Maskulinity")
 Samrat Chakrabarti as Jai ("Maskulinity")
 Madhur Jaffrey as Nani ("Maskulinity")
 Trieste Kelly Dunn as Elliot ("Big Little Chill")
 Rebecca Naomi Jones as Eliza ("Big Little Chill")
 Dolly Wells as Tasha ("Big Little Chill")
 Talia Balsam as Isobel's Mother ("Smash the Plate-triarchy")
 Rain Dove as Elly ("Spun and Done")

Episodes

Season 1 (2017)

Season 2 (2018)

Production

Development
On May 2, 2016, Refinery29 announced during its Digital Content NewFronts presentation that they were producing the series in association with Beachside Productions. The series was expected to be written and directed by Mia Lidofsky and executive produced by Jesse Peretz.

Following the series debut at the Sundance Film Festival in January 2017, Lidofsky continued to try and figure out how to get the show launched and distributed. That spring, Facebook became aware of the series and soon acquired its already produced first season. On June 26, 2017, it was announced that the series had been acquired by Facebook Watch and that it would premiere with the launch of the service in late 2017.

On October 17, 2017, it was reported that Facebook had renewed the series for a second season consisting of ten episodes to premiere in 2018. The runtime of each episode was expected to expand from 15 minutes in length to a more standard TV half-hour (between 20 minutes and 25 minutes).

Filming
Principal photography for season two of the series was expected to begin in late March 2018.

Release

Marketing
On January 20, 2017, a trailer for the first season was released.

Premiere
On January 22, 2017, the series premiered its first three episodes at the annual Sundance Film Festival in Park City, Utah. On July 15, 2017, the series held its official west coast premiere at Outfest in Los Angeles, California where the entire series was screened as part of the film festival's centerpiece screening series.

On June 26, 2018, the series held its second season premiere at The William Vale hotel in New York City, New York. On July 19, 2018, the west coast premiere of the second season is scheduled to be held during Outfest in Los Angeles, California. The first two episodes of season two are set to be screened and will be followed with a question-and-answer session with the cast and crew.

Reception
Strangers has been met with a positive reception from critics upon its release. Mashable critic Laura Prudom claimed that "if you haven't discovered Strangers yet, you're in for a treat." The Knockturnal critic Ivan De Luce praised the show for exploring sexuality in a "fresh way" and that "Unlike other shows about youth, Strangers steers clear of characters who mope about the pointlessness of life, and instead focuses on the positive, namely the many relationships that help us through life’s struggles. As a result, Strangers exudes warmth."

See also
 List of original programs distributed by Facebook Watch

References

External links

2010s American comedy-drama television series
2017 American television series debuts
2010s American LGBT-related drama television series
American comedy web series
English-language television shows
Facebook Watch original programming
American drama web series
American LGBT-related web series